Dimitris Volonakis (born 27 February 1967) is a Greek former professional footballer of an Australian descent who played as defender and the current manager of Kalymnikos.

Club career
Volonakis started sports in the infrastructure sections of the Greek-speaking team Kingsford Megisty and at the age of 12 he immigrated with his parents to Kalymnos. He initially played at Kalymniakos and in 1984 he moved to the amateurs of AEK Athens. He successfully competed in the youth and youth departments and in 1987 the manager of the men's team, Todor Veselinović gave him the opportunity to play in the first team of AEK. The following season the new manager, Dušan Bajević used in just one time. In the summer of 1989 season he played on loan at Diagoras and the following season he signed at Egaleo for the next three seasons, where he won the promotion to the second division in 1991. Afterwards, he played for 6 months at Olympiacos Volos and returned to Egaleo and in the 1995 he moved to Atromitos playing for a season. He continued his career playing for a season at Ialysos, Egaleo,  Leonidio, Achaiki and completed his career in Akarnanikos Fytion in 2001.

International career
In 1985 Volonakis was called to Greece U19, where he had a total of 11 appearances. In the same year, he won 1st place in the Balkan Youth Championship, held at Drama and Kavala. From 1986 to 1988 he was a key member of Greece U21, having 12 appearances and winning 2nd place in the 1988 UEFA European Under-21 Championship, under Andreas Stamatiadis.

Managerial career
In the team that ended his football career, Akarnanikos Fytion, Volonakis started his coaching career in the fourth division in 2001. In 2002 he was the coach of Korfos Elounda of Crete, from 2003 to 2005 he was at Almyros, where he won the amateur cup and from 2005 to 2007 he was at PAO Krousonas, where he emerged champion and was a cup finalist. In the period between 2007 and 2009 he was at Mocho where he made it to local cup final and then again at PAO Krousonas for a year where they also made it to the final of the cup, while in 2010 he returned to Almyros becoming once more the cup finalist. In the summer of 2011 he worked in the OFI U20 team until the summer of 2015, then he worked as an assistant coach for a month in the OFI first team and the rest of the season as the technical director of the OFI academies. In the summer 2016 season he took over the fortunes of PAO Krousonas while since December 2017 he worked for Ermis Zoniana in the third division with whom he won the Rethymno FCA Cup. In the summer of 2018, he took over Almyros, where he lost the championship in the last game of the play-offs. He returned to PAO Krousonas again in October 2019 where finished at the 3rd place. In April 2021, he returned for the fourth time to Almyros where he led them to the fourth place for the championship of the C National League, the best place in the history of the club. From July 2022, he is the manager of Kalymniakos.

Personal life
Volonakis is a graduate of the School of Physical Education and Sport Science department of National and Kapodistrian University of Athens and a certified UEFA A' coach. From 2005 to 2009 he was employed as a gymnast-coach at the Athletic High School of Heraklion in Crete, whose team he led to three Panhellenic championships and participation in the 2009 World Schools Championship in Antalya, Turkey, where he won 13th place.

Honours

As a player
AEK Athens 
Alpha Ethniki: 1988–89

Leonidio
Arcadia FCA Cup: 1998–99

Greece U19
Balkan Youth Championship: 1985

As a coach

Almyros
Thessaly FCA League: 2003–04, 2010–11

PAO Krousonas
Heraklion FCA Championship: 2005−06

Ermis Zoniana
Rethymno FCA Cup: 2017–18

References

1967 births
Living people
Greek footballers
Super League Greece players
AEK Athens F.C. players
Olympiacos Volos F.C. players
Diagoras F.C. players
Egaleo F.C. players
Atromitos F.C. players
Association football defenders
Greek football managers
People from Kalymnos
Sportspeople from the South Aegean
Soccer players from Sydney